Three-finger salute may refer to:

Three-finger salute (Serbian), a salute used by Serbs
Three-finger salute (Sicilian), a salute used by Sicilian nationalists and separatists
Three-finger salute (pro-democracy), a gesture originally from the Hunger Games books and films and later used in protests in Myanmar and Thailand
Three-finger salute, a jocular term for the three-key command Control-Alt-Delete
Scout sign and salute, the salute of the World Scouting Movement

See also
Two-finger salute

Other hand gestures involving three fingers:
OK gesture, holds a variety of meanings in different countries and contexts
Schwurhand, a traditional gesture used in central Europe when swearing an oath
Shocker (gesture), holds vulgar or sexual meanings
Tryzub salute, a gesture used to mimic the Ukrainian Tryzub
Kühnen salute or Kühnengruss, a replacement for the Nazi salute